The following is the cumulative medal count for countries at the European Figure Skating Championships. It includes countries that no longer exist.

Men

European Championships 1893 (annulled by the ISU) included

Multiple gold medalists
Boldface denotes active skaters and highest medal count among all skaters (including these who not included in these tables) per type.

Women

Multiple gold medalists
Boldface denotes active skaters and highest medal count among all skaters (including these who not included in these tables) per type.

Pairs

Multiple gold medalists
Boldface denotes active skaters and highest medal count among all pairs or separate partners (including these who not included in these tables) per type. Italic denotes statistics of performances of separate skaters with different partners.

* In 1973 and 1974, Alexei Ulanov won one silver medal and one bronze medal partnering with Lyudmila Smirnova

Ice dance

Multiple gold medalists
Boldface denotes active skaters and highest medal count among all duos or separate dancers (including these who not included in these tables) per type. Italic denotes statistics of performances of separate dancers with different partners.

Overall

Multiple gold medalists
Boldface denotes active skaters and highest medal count among all skaters (including these who not included in these tables) per type.

References
http://www.isuresults.com/events/EC10_MediaGuide.pdf

See also
Four Continents Figure Skating Championships cumulative medal count

European Figure Skating Championships
Europeans
Lists of figure skating medalists